In Pursuit of Blackness is an album by the American saxophonist Joe Henderson, released in 1971 on Milestone. It contains three tracks recorded in the studio in 1971 with saxophonist Pete Yellin, trombonist Curtis Fuller, pianist George Cables and the Return to Forever rhythm section Stanley Clarke and Lenny White, and two tracks recorded live at the Lighthouse Café in 1970 with the live band featured on Henderson’s previous album.

Track listing
All pieces by Joe Henderson, unless otherwise noted.

"No Me Esqueca" - 7:08
"Invitation" (Bronisław Kaper) - 7:34
"A Shade of Jade" - 7:45
"Gazelle" - 7:33
"Mind Over Matter" - 13:19

Personnel
Joe Henderson - tenor sax
Woody Shaw - trumpet (2, 4)
Curtis Fuller - trombone (1, 3, 5)
Pete Yellin - alto sax, flute, bass clarinet (1, 3, 5)
George Cables - electric piano
Ron McClure (2, 4), Stanley Clarke (1, 3, 5) - bass
Lenny White - drums
Tony Waters - congas (4)

References

Milestone Records albums
Joe Henderson albums
1971 albums